Cyrtopodion agamuroides, also known by the common names Nikolsky's spider gecko, Nikolsky's Iranian gecko, or the Makran spider gecko, is a species of gecko, a lizard in the family Gekkonidae. The species is endemic to eastern Iran and Pakistan.

References

Further reading
Anderson, Steven C. (1963). "Amphibians and Reptiles from Iran". Proc. California Acad. Sci., Fourth Series 31 (16): 417-498. (Cyrtodactylus agamuroides, pp. 438-439, Figure 9).
Bauer, Aaron M.; Masroor, Rafaqat; Titus-McQuillan, James; Heinicke, Matthew P.; Daza, Juan D; Jackman, Todd R. (2013). "A preliminary phylogeny of the Palearctic naked-toed geckos (Reptilia: Squamata: Gekkonidae) with taxonomic implications". Zootaxa 3599 (4): 301-324.
Nikolsky AM (1900). "Reptiles, amphibies [sic] et poissons, recueillis pendant le voyage de Mr. N. A. Zaroudny en 1898 dans la Perse ". Annuaire du Musée Zoologique de l'Académie Impériale des Sciences de St. Pétersbourg 24 (4): 376-417 + Plate XX. (Gymnodactylus agamuroides, new species, pp. 384-385). (Text in Russian, diagnoses and localities in Latin, title in French and Russian).

Cyrtopodion
Reptiles described in 1900
Taxa named by Alexander Nikolsky